Erika Helmke (1908–2002) was a German stage and film actress. She married the Canadian artist Herbert Dassel and emigrated to Canada.

Selected filmography
 The Spanish Fly (1931)
 I Do Not Want to Know Who You Are (1932)
 The Lake Calls (1933)
 Paul and Pauline (1936)
 The Night With the Emperor (1936)
 Dangerous Game (1937)
 Liberated Hands (1939)
 The Gasman (1941)
 Clarissa (1941)
 Everything for Gloria (1941)

References

Bibliography
 Hinton, Stephen. Kurt Weill: The Threepenny Opera. CUP Archive, 1990.

External links

1908 births
2002 deaths
German film actresses
German stage actresses
German emigrants to Canada
Actresses from Berlin
20th-century German women singers